Is It College Yet? is a 2002 American animated comedy-drama television film written by Glenn Eichler and Peggy Nicoll, and directed by Karen Disher. The film was the second film-length installment of MTV's animated series Daria, after 2000's Is it Fall Yet?, and served as the series finale, chronicling the end of high school as the characters prepare for college.

Is It College Yet? was produced in lieu of an abbreviated, six-episode sixth season requested by MTV. Series creator Glenn Eichler planned to wrap the show with the fifth-season finale "Boxing Daria", believing that there was no more story to tell.

The film was first broadcast by MTV on January 21, 2002, released on both VHS and DVD formats on August 27, 2002, and was included on the DVD release of Daria: The Complete Animated Series on May 11, 2010. The film has yet to see a Blu-ray release.

Plot
Daria applies to prestigious Bromwell University and the less famous Raft College for her second choice. Her boyfriend Tom Sloane also applies to Bromwell, where his family have legacy status. Tom's mother agrees to drive them to tour Bromwell in fictional Newtown, followed by Raft in Boston. At Bromwell, Tom charms the admission officer with stories about his family's experiences there, while a nervous Daria fumbles her interview. To Daria's dismay, they arrive at Raft after the admission office has closed. Daria is accepted by Raft, but wait listed by Bromwell. Tom gets into Bromwell and offers to have his parents write Daria a letter of recommendation, but she declines.

Jane wants to attend Boston Fine Arts College (BFAC), but is overwhelmed with creating a portfolio. After being rejected by several less demanding colleges, she considers skipping college entirely. Her older brother Trent encourages this idea, but Daria talks her into sending a portfolio to BFAC, and Jane is accepted. Trent initially calls her a sellout, but finally admits he is going to miss her. Jane points out he will have lots of chances to play gigs in Boston and sleep on her floor.

Daria accepts Tom's parents recommendation to Bromwell, but is ultimately rejected anyway. To Tom's surprise, Daria breaks up with him, explaining that their lives are diverging and the relationship has run its course. They nevertheless remain on friendly terms and promise to keep in touch.

Jodie, exhausted from being the model minority student at Lawndale, wants to attend historically black Turner College, while her parents expect her to attend the exclusive Crestmore University. Jodie is accepted by both, but does not believe she can attend Turner if her parents do not accept her decision. Mack contacts Jodie's father to explain her distress, leading to her parents changing their minds. Mack is accepted to Vance College on scholarship. While they will be geographically separated, Jodie is convinced this experience has brought them closer.

Brittney is accepted to local Prairie State University, but boyfriend Kevin will need to repeat his senior year due to abysmal grades. Embarrassed, Kevin tries to hide this from Brittney before coming clean, and asks if she will stay with him through college. Brittney promises she will, while secretly crossing her fingers.

Daria's younger sister, Quinn, gets her first job as a restaurant hostess and befriends an older co-worker named Lindy. Quinn's work causes her to miss several Fashion Club meetings, and the clique drifts apart; after club president Sandi is rude to her, Stacey secretly wishes that Sandi would "just shut up" and feels guilty when Sandi suffers a vocal chord injury that causes her to lose her voice. Quinn notices Lindy has a drinking problem, which culminates with Lindy arriving at work drunk and getting fired. Quinn implores her to seek help, but Lindy angrily denies Quinn's assertions. Lindy later apologizes, but still insists she is not an alcoholic. At an end-of-year party, after Sandi tries to punish Stacey for her bad thoughts, Stacey bluntly says she would rather take a "sabbatical" like Quinn did for her job, and Tiffany joins in, followed by Sandi in an attempt to save face. The group then agrees to hang out as friends without the club banner.

At graduation, Daria wins an academic award and improvises a speech in which she reiterates her contempt for high school, but ends with a summation of her life philosophy and expresses gratitude for Jane and her family, drawing applause from the crowd. Afterwards, Daria and Jane meet for pizza as usual, and muse on what they will find once they arrive at college and begin a new era in their lives.

Soundtrack 
The first music video for "Breaking Up the Girl" by Garbage premiered as part of the film, featuring a Daria montage, and the song was promoted as the "theme song" for College; the song used during the title sequence of the film was Splendora's last-ever song "College Try (Gives Me Blisters)".

Alternate version
An edited version of this TV-movie was cablecast by MTV in reruns, which cut several minutes from the original broadcast version. A VHS was distributed in 2002 by MTV Home Video/ Paramount. Both DVD releases (the original single-disc release and the Complete Animated Series release) include the edited version. The original was presumed to be lost until 2020, when a home-made restored version was released on the web. This version was created using the original DVD release with the inclusion of the previously cut parts recovered from an old MTV recording.

Cast

Tracy Grandstaff as Daria Morgendorffer
Wendy Hoopes as Jane Lane, Helen Morgendorffer and Quinn Morgendorffer
Julián Rebolledo as Jake Morgendorffer
 Alvaro J. Gonzales as Trent Lane
 Russell Hankin as Tom Sloane
Marc Thompson as Anthony DiMartino, Timothy O'Neill, Kevin Thompson and Jamie White
 Tim Novikoff as Jeffy
 Steven Huppert as Joey
 Jessica Cyndee Jackson as Jodie Landon
 Amir Williams as Michael Jordan "Mack-Daddy" Mackenzie
 Janie Mertz as Sandi Griffin, Brittany Taylor and Andrea
 Sarah Drew as Stacy Rowe
 Ashley Albert as Tiffany Blum-Decker and Janet Barch
 Geoffrey Arend as Charles "Upchuck" Ruttheimer III
 Nora Laudani as Angela Li
 Bart Fasbender as Andrew Landon
 Laurine Towler as Michele Landon
 Rand Bridges as Bill Woods
 Jessica Hardin as Lindy
 Daniel Milledge as Angier Sloane
 Amanda Fox as Katherine Sloane
 John W. Lynn, Jr. as Sick, Sad World Announcer

Reception
In a review of the movie and the show in general, Slate reporter Emily Nussbaum said Is It College Yet? was "a bit of a classic" for showing its "sharply funny exploration of social class... the high-schoolers head off to very different paths in life, based on their economic prospects — unlike, say, the characters on 90210."

References

External links 

 
 

Daria films
2002 television films
2002 films
2002 animated films
2002 comedy-drama films
2000s American animated films
2000s English-language films
2000s high school films
2000s teen comedy-drama films
American adult animated films
American animated comedy films
American animated television films
American comedy-drama television films
American high school films
American sequel films
American teen comedy-drama films
American television series finales
Animated drama films
Animated films about friendship
Films directed by Karen Disher
MTV animated films
MTV original films
Television films based on television series
Television sequel films